The Portland, Maine Streetcar Strike occurred from July 12 to July 17, 1916, in Portland, Maine, United States. It was won by the workers largely due to overwhelming public support.

Background
The first electric streetcars appeared in Portland in 1895 and fully replaced horse-drawn carriages in the spring of 1896. The city's streetcars were owned and operated by the Portland Railroad Company, which was initially locally owned but was purchased by the out-of-state brokerage firm E. W. Clark & Co. in 1912. Working 10-hour shifts seven days a week and regularly exposed to hazardous weather, a section of the Amalgamated Association of Street Railway Employees of America was formed in 1905 but all of the workers associated with it were immediately fired.

See also
 Railroad history of Portland, Maine
 Streetcar strikes in the United States

References

History of Portland, Maine
1916 in Maine
1916 labor disputes and strikes
Economy of Portland, Maine
Labor disputes in Maine
Streetcar strikes in the United States
20th century in Portland, Maine